Edward Henry Allen (March 2, 1908 – May 7, 1942) was a member of the United States Navy who was awarded the Navy Cross and Gold Star for his heroism.

Navy career
Born in Pekin, North Dakota, Allen graduated from the U.S. Naval Academy in 1931. He served with Scouting Squadron 2 in Lexington (CV-2).

Awarded the Navy Cross and Gold Star
Lieutenant Allen was reported missing 7 May 1942 when his plane was shot down by enemy aircraft during the Battle of the Coral Sea. He was awarded a Navy Cross for the defense of his carrier 20 February 1942 and a Gold Star in lieu of a second Navy Cross for the action in which he lost his life.

Namesake
Edward H. Allen (DE-531) was launched 7 October 1943 by Boston Navy Yard; sponsored by Mrs. David H. Clark; and commissioned 16 December 1943, Lieutenant Commander M. M. Sanford in command.

Attribution

1908 births
1942 deaths
United States Navy personnel killed in World War II
Aviators killed by being shot down
People from Nelson County, North Dakota
Victims of aviation accidents or incidents in international waters
Recipients of the Navy Cross (United States)
United States Naval Academy alumni
United States Naval Aviators
United States Navy officers
Aviators killed in aviation accidents or incidents